Stavros Stamatis (born 13 January 1966) is a Greek former professional footballer who played as midfielder.

Club career
Stamatis started his football career in 1980 at Ilioupoli. In 1986 he played for Charavgiakos before making his big move to AEK Athens in December 1988. He came to AEK as an attacking midfielder, but eventually became a "versatile" footballer who played in all positions of the center and the defense, but established himself mainly as a defensive midfielder. A player with good technique and passing, with the ability to "stick" the ball in his feet and carry it over long distances on the pitch, but not without his defensive capabilities. A useful tool under Dušan Bajević, often contributed as the "12th player" of the team. His lack of speed was his main playing disadvantage. On 7 May 1989, he had a very good performance in the historic 0–1 away win against Olympiacos, which gave AEK the title. His greatest appearance was at 21 October 1992, in the victory against Eindhoven with 1–0 for the European Cup, where he was very effective as a sweeper. On 1 April 1995, he scored his last goal for AEK in the derby against Olympiacos to form the final 2–2 at home.  Stamatis played at AEK for 7 years, where he won 4 league titles, 1 Super Cup and 1 League Cup. In December 1995 he left for Ionikos where he played for 3 seasons, and later in Panelefsiniakos and Atromitos for one season each, before retiring in 2000.

International career
Stamatis made 5 appearances with Greece between 1989 and 1990.

After football
After the end of his career, Stamatis maintains his own cafeteria business in Athens.

Personal life
His son Andreas, played in AEK for the 2012–13 season and in fact the two of them are the only father-son "couple" to date who have both scored for AEK.

Honours

AEK Athens 
Alpha Ethniki: 1988–89, 1991–92, 1992–93, 1993–94
Greek Super Cup: 1989
Greek League Cup: 1990

References

1966 births
Living people
Super League Greece players
Greece international footballers
Ilioupoli F.C. players
A.O. Charavgiakos players
AEK Athens F.C. players
Ionikos F.C. players
Panelefsiniakos F.C. players
Atromitos F.C. players
Association football midfielders
Footballers from Athens
Greek footballers